Kévin Azaïs (born 1992) is a French actor. He is best known for his performance in the film Love at First Fight (Les Combattants), for which he won a César Award for Most Promising Actor and a Lumières Award for Most Promising Actor.

He is the brother of actor Vincent Rottiers.

Filmography

References

External links

 

1992 births
Living people
French male film actors
21st-century French male actors
Most Promising Actor Lumières Award winners
Most Promising Actor César Award winners
Place of birth missing (living people)